Willy Bocklant (26 January 1941 – 6 June 1985) was a Belgian professional road racing cyclist active as a professional between 1962 and 1969. Among his biggest victories are the 1964 edition of Liège–Bastogne–Liège and the overall classification of the Tour de Romandie in 1963. Bocklant was born in Bellegem and died in Mouscron.

Palmarès

External links 

1941 births
1985 deaths
Sportspeople from Kortrijk
Cyclists from West Flanders
Belgian male cyclists
20th-century Belgian people